"Never Gonna Break My Faith" is a Grammy Award-winning, Golden Globe nominated song by American soul singer Aretha Franklin. It was released in October 2006 as a duet with Mary J Blige and Boys Choir of Harlem and featured in the film Bobby about the last moments of the life of Robert F. Kennedy. The film was directed by Emilio Estevez.

Twelve years after its release in the film, an unheard solo performance of Aretha Franklin singing the song was released to commemorate Juneteeth 2020 with a new video visualizing the American human rights movement. This caused the song to enter the Billboard gospel charts at #1, giving Franklin the distinction of having had #1 records in every decade since the 1960s

Background

Written by songwriters Bryan Adams and Eliot Kennedy, the song was awarded a Grammy Award for Best Gospel/Contemporary Christian Music Performance in 2008. Andrea Remanda is also credited as songwriter on the song. Franklin performed the song live at the musicares event on 8 February 2008, when she was honored as the MusiCares Person of the Year, 2008.

References 

2006 songs
Aretha Franklin songs
Songs written by Bryan Adams
Songs written by Eliot Kennedy
Gospel songs